Kenneth Earl Konz (September 25, 1928 – February 5, 2008) was an American football defensive back who played with the National Football League's Cleveland Browns from 1953 to 1959. Konz was selected by the Browns in the 1951 NFL Draft out of Louisiana State.

External links

Konz at databaseFootball.com

1928 births
2008 deaths
American football defensive backs
Cleveland Browns players
Eastern Conference Pro Bowl players
LSU Tigers football players
People from Weimar, Texas